Brachycythara reidenbachi, is an extinct species of sea snail, a marine gastropod mollusk in the family Mangeliidae.

Description

Distribution
This extinct marine species can be found in Late Pliocene and Early Pleistocene strata in the James City and Chowan River Formations of North Carolina, USA; age range: 11.608 to 2.588 Ma

References
''

External links
 Worldwide Mollusk Species Data Base: Brachycythara reidenbachi
 Fossilworks: Brachycythara reidenbachi

reidenbachi